The following is a list of Sydney Swans (formerly South Melbourne Football Club) leading goalkickers in each season of the Australian Football League (formerly the Victorian Football League).

See also

References

External links
 Sydney Swans Goalkicking Records

Goallkickers
Sydney-sport-related lists
Australian rules football-related lists